St. Mary Catholic Academy (also referred to SMCA, St. Mary CA, or St. Mary), previously known as St. Mary's Catholic Secondary School until Oct 2016 and Brother Edmund Rice Annex until 1984 is a Catholic secondary school located in Toronto, Ontario, Canada founded by Faithful Companions of Jesus in 1982.

Notable alumni
Frank Jonke, soccer player
John Jonke, soccer player, younger brother of Frank Jonke
The 6th Letter, rapper

See also
List of high schools in Ontario

References 

St. Mary Catholic Academy. Toronto Catholic District School Board. Retrieved on 2008-09-13.

External links
 St. Mary Catholic Academy

Toronto Catholic District School Board
Educational institutions established in 1982
Educational institutions established in 1984
High schools in Toronto
Catholic secondary schools in Ontario
1982 establishments in Ontario
International Baccalaureate schools in Ontario